Metropolitan Memorial Park aka Met Park was a baseball stadium in Norfolk, Virginia. Built in 1969, it was the home to the Norfolk Tides (known at that time as the Tidewater Tides) until the construction of Harbor Park was completed for the Tides to play the 1993 season there.

Met Park sat 6,200, and was located near the end of the primary runway of the Norfolk International Airport. This often proved distracting to fans and players when aircraft flew overhead, but inadvertently proved strategic – as the AAA franchise of the New York Mets, players for the Tides could hope to someday be called to play in Shea Stadium, the location of which endures similar noise from nearby LaGuardia Airport.

After Met Park was demolished following the Tides' move to Harbor Park, the city built the Lake Wright Executive Center on the former Met Park land.

Defunct baseball venues in the United States
Sports venues in Norfolk, Virginia
Baseball venues in Virginia
1969 establishments in Virginia
Sports venues completed in 1969
Defunct minor league baseball venues
1990s disestablishments in Virginia